Carbonnier is a surname of Franco-German origin, in addition to Austria, Germany and Switzerland. The name may refer to:

People
Jean Carbonnier (1908–2003) was one of the most important French jurists of the 20th century.
Pierre Carbonnier (7 August 1828 – 8 April 1883)  was a French  scientist, ichthyologist, fish breeder and public Aquarium director
Marianne Carbonnier-Burkard (1949-) historian

References 

French-language surnames
Surnames of French origin
Swiss-German surnames